Tracey Anarella (born January 28, 1963) is an American documentary film maker.

Career 
Anarella made her debut as the director of Jesse and the Fountain of Youth (2013), an 11-minute documentary about a New York City subway busker. The movie won the "Emerging Artists Award" at the McMinnville Short Film Festival (2013), "Best Short Film" at the Idyllwild International Festival of Cinema (2014) and "Best Documentary" at the Laughlin International Film Festival (2014).

In 2014 Anarella shot a 12-minute documentary Brooklyn United about the Brooklyn United Marching Band. The movie received three nominations at the Idyllwild International Festival of Cinema in 2015 and was featured in the Cannes Short Corner marketplace at the 2015 Cannes Film Festival and at Jecheon International Music & Film Festival (Jecheon, South Korea). She continued with a 10-minute documentary Beautiful Lies (2016) about her father, 87 year-old artist George Williams, who suffers from dementia and talks about his life through his alter ego named Charles. It premiered at 2016 Harlem International Film Festival and later was screened at Laughlin International Film Festival (2016). SENE Film, Art and Music Festival (2017) and YoFiFest (2017).

In 2017, Anarella made Not Black Enough, her first full-length documentary featuring Vanessa Williams, Petey Pablo, Henry Louis Gates Jr. and Florence LaRue. It was featured at WOW Middle Eastern Film Festival (Dubai, United Arab Emirates), The Ethnografilm Festival (Paris, France), at Roxbury Film Festival, Austin Revolution Film Festival, Laughlin International Film Festival, Buffalo Niagara Film Festival, Queens World Film Festival, SENE Film, Art and Music Festival and at International Black Film Festival, Charlotte Black Film Festival, 19th San Francisco Black Film Festival and African Diaspora Film Festival.

In 2017, Anarella started to film Livingston Taylor: Life Is Good, a documentary about American folk musician Livingston Taylor. The movie was partially crowdfunded at Indiegogo.

Awards and nominations

References

External links
 

1963 births
Living people
American documentary filmmakers
Cornell University alumni
Gabelli School of Business alumni
People from Cleveland